Grace P. Campbell (1883 – 1943) was the first African-American woman to run for state office in New York. She was also the first female African-American member of the Socialist Party and the Communist Party of America.

Life
Campbell was born in 1883 to Emma Dyson Campbell and William Campbell in Georgia. Her mother was from Washington, D.C. and her father was an immigrant from Jamaica. The family went from Texas to Washington, D.C. Eventually, Campbell moved to New York City in 1905.

Career
When she arrived in New York, Campbell devoted herself to community projects. She worked as a supervisor for the Empire Friendly Shelter, a home for unwed mothers. She donated part of her salary to found the organization, and funded it mostly on her own. Starting in 1915, she also worked for New York City. Campbell also worked in the Women's Sections of the Tombs Prison in New York as Chief Nurse. She was also employed as a probation officer, then a parole officer, and finally a court attendant for the Courts of Sessions in 1924. Around this time, she became involved in the Socialist Party of America. She became one of the founding members of the 21st assembly branch, and was the first African-American woman to join the party. She was also the first African-American woman member of the Communist Party of America. In 1919 and 1920, she ran unsuccessfully for office in the New York State Assembly on the Socialist ticket.

Campbell continued to be active in political circles. She was the only female member of the 21st A.D. Socialist Club in 1918, and also acted as the club's secretary. She helped found the People's Educational Forum in 1920, a forum that was used to debate popular issues. The forum also opposed Marcus Garvey. In 1921, she moved away from the Socialist party. She was one of the founding members, along with Cyril Briggs and others, of the African Blood Brotherhood. She was the only woman to help found the organization, and also the only woman who served on its council. Campbell also hosted a group of African Americans of varying political views who would congregate to discuss matters they were passionate about. In doing so, in 1920, she founded the Harlem Community Church alongside political activists Richard B. Moore, Frank Crosswaith, and W. A. Domingo in Harlem, New York, This group later changed its name to Harlem Unitarian. Eventually, while involved in her radical politics she became an atheist.

In the 1920s, she joined the Communist Workers' Party where she worked as an organizer. She was monitored by the Federal Bureau of Investigation. She continued her work and remained actively involved in politics and civil service until her death in 1943, aged 60.

1919 and 1920 New York State Assembly election
Campbell ran for the New York State Assembly's 19th District on the Socialist party ticket. She was supported by  Chandler Owen and A. Philip Randolph.  She ran in both 1919 and 1920, and was ultimately unsuccessful. However, her groundbreaking ticket won 10% of the vote, nearly 2,000 votes, more than any other black Socialist party candidate. This included both Randolph and Owen. Despite her lack of success, she was the first African-American woman to run for public office in the state of New York.

References

External links
 Herb Boyd, "Grace P. Campbell, a political activist in the shadows", New York Amsterdam News, May 6, 2021.

1883 births
1943 deaths
African-American women in politics
Women in New York (state) politics
American socialists
American people of Jamaican descent
New York (state) socialists
20th-century African-American people
20th-century African-American women